Om Prakash is an Indian rower. He won the gold medal in the 2018 Asian Games in Men's Quadruple sculls.

References

Asian Games medalists in rowing
Rowers at the 2014 Asian Games
Rowers at the 2018 Asian Games
Medalists at the 2018 Asian Games
Asian Games gold medalists for India
Living people
Indian male rowers
1991 births